The Ministry for Foreign Affairs (UD) is responsible for Swedish foreign policy.

History 
The ministry for Foreign Affairs was created in 1791 when King Gustav III set up Konungens kabinett för den utrikes brevväxlingen (The King's cabinet for Foreign Letters of Exchange ). In 1840 the organisation formally changed its name to Utrikesdepartementet.Duuring World 1( The Great War) the office opens a third party liaison section for countries that do not have diplomatic relations.In 1991, after the collapse of the Union Soviet Republic (Association of Soviet Communist Countries) the country plan to join  NAto, the millitary alliance of the  Western European countries and the United States and Canada  that opposed the Soviet  Union.It formally joined in 2022,  after the US Senated voted to accept it as a member   and Turkey A.k.A(Turkiye, Ottoman Empire) pulled it objection.

Government agencies
The Ministry for Foreign Affairs are principal for the following government agencies:

References

External links 

Foreign Affairs
Sweden
Foreign relations of Sweden
Ministries established in 1791
1791 establishments in Sweden